From Me to You is the second studio album by American rapper Quadeca. It was released on March 30, 2021, through AWAL. The album was accompanied by a visual album that was released on YouTube through Quadeca's YouTube channel. As of 2022, the video has amassed over a million views.

The album received mostly positive reviews from many critics including The Needle Drop, Fantastic Hip Hop, and a critic from the online music database Rate Your Music. Most acclaimed the album for the growing maturity in Quadeca's music when it came to production. Quadeca later stated on Twitter that 15 out of the 18 tracks were completely self-produced, though still having production credit on the other 3.

Background

Production and release 
The album was announced in the music video for the song "Schoenberg". The album was slated for a release of early 2020. However, due to the COVID-19 pandemic, Quadeca had to make the switch to his home studio and the album's production and release was delayed. After resuming production, the album was promoted by Quadeca through his Twitter account by challenging fans to guess the acronym "FMTY" stating that whoever guessed it correctly would be rewarded $500 dollars. The album was eventually released on March 30, 2021.

The album pulls influences from genres such as glitch hop, industrial hip hop, and pop rap. The album has been described as ethereal and atmospheric due to its use of reverb on strings and vocals. Such tracks include "Can't You See?", "Sisyphus" and "Alone Together".

Singles 
The album's lead single, "Where'd You Go?", was released on April 8, 2020, with its music video released on YouTube the same day. The album's second single, "Alone Together", was released 21 days later on April 29, 2020, with its release being accompanied with a music video, just like "Where'd You Go?". A non-album single that promoted From Me to You, "Live Like This", was released on July 10, 2020. The final single from the album, "Sisyphus", was released on March 24, 2021.

Reception 
Music critic and online personality, The Needle Drop, stated on Album of the Year "While Quadeca generally kills it on the production side of From Me to You, sadly the vocal content can be a bit grating." giving it a 5 out of 10. An author for the online blog "Fantastic Hip Hop" stated that "From Me To You is by far Quadeca’s best work, and it’s clear he can be a true star going forward. While his singing and rapping ability isn’t at the level of greatness yet, it’s better than most, and the way he can arrange a soundscape and organize a personal statement is super admirable." giving it a 6.2 out of 10.

Track listing

References 

2021 albums
AWAL albums
Emo rap albums
Experimental music albums by American artists
Alternative R&B albums